Robert Carberry (born 6 January 1931) was a Scottish footballer who played as a half-back in the Football League for Norwich City, Gillingham, and Port Vale between 1953 and 1958.

Career
Carberry played for Avondale, before joining Norwich City in 1953, who were then managed by Norman Low. He made five Third Division South appearances in 1953–54 and 1954–55 before departing Carrow Road. He spent the 1955–56 season in the Southern League with Bedford Town, playing sixteen matches. He signed with Archie Clark's Gillingham, and featured once in the Third Division South in the 1956–57 season. He joined league rivals Port Vale in July 1957, in a move that reunited him with Norman Low, and his debut came at centre-half in a 1–0 away triumph at Aldershot on 24 August. He enjoyed regular football from that game until he lost his place in February 1958. He transferred to Exeter City in August 1958, having made 32 league and cup appearances for the "Valiants" in 1957–58. He did not play in the Fourth Division for the "Grecians", but instead moved back to the Southern League with Burton Albion.

Career statistics
Source:

References

1931 births
Footballers from Glasgow
Scottish footballers
Association football wing halves
Norwich City F.C. players
Bedford Town F.C. players
Gillingham F.C. players
Port Vale F.C. players
Exeter City F.C. players
Burton Albion F.C. players
English Football League players
Southern Football League players
Living people